Daragh Gerard Marion O'Malley (born 25 May 1954) is an Irish actor, director and producer. He was born in Dublin, Ireland.

Among many TV appearances O'Malley is known for his portrayal of Patrick Harper in the series Sharpe (1993–2009), starring Sean Bean. O'Malley first appeared in roles in the films The Long Good Friday and Withnail and I, guest roles in many UK television series including Tales of the Unexpected, Waking The Dead and Vera, TV roles in Longitude, Cleopatra and The Magnificent Seven, and US TV film Vendetta. O'Malley also played Irish explorer Tom Crean in the 8 part television series The Last Place on Earth.

In 2011 O'Malley turned his focus to the stage, appearing in productions in the US and in the UK. Among over a dozen stage productions O'Malley appeared as Father Jack in a revival of Dancing at Lughnasa, which was nominated for an MTA Best Production Award, and followed that by playing John Rainey in a London revival of Irvine's Mixed Marriage, which received positive reviews. In 2014, O'Malley appeared as Big Daddy in a production of Cat on a Hot Tin Roof at The Royal Exchange Theatre Manchester, for which he was nominated for an MTA Best Actor award, while UK's The Stage selected O'Malley's performance as one of the Top Five Performances in UK theatre in 2014.

Awards
O'Malley produced the Irish version of The Rocky Horror Show in Dublin; the show won numerous awards, including a Best Production Jacob's Award. The show's playwright, Richard O'Brien, described O'Malley's Irish production as "without doubt, the sexiest version of my show ever produced".

In Los Angeles, O'Malley won a Drama-Logue Best Actor Award for his 1998 performance as Sweeney in Patrick Marber's Dealers Choice at The Mark Taper Forum.

A one-off episode of the BBC Series Doctors, a two-handed episode in which O'Malley appeared with actor Christopher Timothy, won a BANFF TV Award.

In 2011, a production of Dancing at Lughnasa in which O'Malley appeared as Father Jack was nominated for an MTA Award.

In 2015, O'Malley was nominated for an MTA Award and STAGE Best Actor Award for his performance as Big Daddy in Tennessee Williams' Cat on a Hot Tin Roof at the Royal Exchange, Manchester.

Charity work
O'Malley was founder of The Sharpe's Children Foundation, a charity designed to fight poverty with education and take orphaned and destitute children off the streets of the Third World and into residential primary education. The SCF was launched at Apsley House, London,  home of the Duke of Wellington, in October 2010. Team India, sponsored by The Sharpe's Children Foundation and made up of children who lived in railway carriages at Delhi Railway Station and who played football in the railway yards, won The Street Children's World Cup in Durban, South Africa in 2010. 
The Sharpe's Children Foundation was chosen as World Charity of The Year in 2012 by Intellectual Property Magazine and was integrated with The Consortium for Street Children later that year.

Filmography

References

External links
 
 

Irish male film actors
Irish male television actors
1954 births
Living people
People from County Dublin
Alumni of the London Academy of Music and Dramatic Art
People educated at Crescent College